Headley Grange is a former workhouse in Headley, Hampshire, England. It is a Grade II listed historic building. It is best known for its use as a recording and rehearsal venue in the 1960s and 1970s, by acts including Led Zeppelin,  Genesis and  Help Yourself.

Early history
Built in 1795, Headley Grange is a three-storey stone structure which was originally used as a workhouse for the poor, infirm, and orphaned. It was built for the poor of three parishes: Bramshott, Headley and Kingsley. It was the centre of a riot in 1830. The building was bought in 1870 by builder Thomas Kemp for £420; he converted it into a private residence, and named it Headley Grange.

Use as a recording and rehearsal studio
Parts of Led Zeppelin's albums Led Zeppelin III, Led Zeppelin IV, Houses of the Holy and Physical Graffiti were composed and/or recorded at Headley Grange. Led Zeppelin vocalist Robert Plant wrote most of the lyrics to Led Zeppelin's "Stairway to Heaven" there in a single day. The Led Zeppelin song "Black Dog", which, like "Stairway", appeared on Led Zeppelin IV, was named after a black Labrador Retriever which was found hanging around Headley Grange during recording. 

According to Led Zeppelin guitarist Jimmy Page:

In an interview he gave to Mojo magazine in 2010, Page elaborated:

Help Yourself lived at The Grange from 1971 to 1973 and rehearsed for both their Beware The Shadow and Strange Affair albums whilst in residence.

Peter Gabriel and other Genesis members have acknowledged writing much of the material for their 1974 concept album The Lamb Lies Down on Broadway at the retreat.

Depiction in It Might Get Loud
In the 2009 documentary It Might Get Loud, Page is filmed visiting Headley Grange and discussing the recording of Led Zeppelin IV there. He discussed how the drums for "When the Levee Breaks" were recorded in the cavernous hallway, with its echoing acoustics.

He later recalled of this visit:

References

External links
Headley Grange website
History of Headley Grange

1795 establishments in England
Residential buildings completed in 1795
Grade II listed buildings
Workhouses in England
Houses in Hampshire
Recording studios in England
Former recording studios
Led Zeppelin
Genesis (band)